Šárka Křížková (born 2 May 1990) is a Czech female badminton player.

Achievements

BWF International Challenge/Series
Women's Doubles

 BWF International Challenge tournament
 BWF International Series tournament
 BWF Future Series tournament

References

External links
 
 
 

1990 births
Living people
Sportspeople from Hradec Králové
Czech female badminton players
European Games competitors for the Czech Republic
Badminton players at the 2015 European Games